Andreas Stamatis (born 12 May 1993) is a Greek professional footballer who plays as a striker for Super League 2 club Apollon Larissa. He is the son of the former international footballer, Stavros Stamatis.

Career statistics

Club

References

External links
 
Onsports.gr Profile
Myplayer.gr Profile

1993 births
Living people
Panionios F.C. players
AEK Athens F.C. players
Paniliakos F.C. players
AO Chania F.C. players
Iraklis Psachna F.C. players
Pierikos F.C. players
Panegialios F.C. players
Aris Thessaloniki F.C. players
Trikala F.C. players
A.E. Karaiskakis F.C. players
Apollon Larissa F.C. players
Super League Greece players
Football League (Greece) players
Super League Greece 2 players
Association football forwards
Footballers from Athens
Greek footballers